Weinheimer is a German surname. Notable people with the surname include:

Frank Weinheimer (1887–?), American politician
John J. Weinheimer (c. 1896 – 1951), American football player and coach

See also
Paula Hahn-Weinheimer (1917–2002), German geochemist

German-language surnames